Black Bear Island (2006–2010) was a Thoroughbred racehorse from Ireland. Sired by Sadler's Wells from the dam Kasora, Black Bear Island was a full brother to six time Group One winner High Chaparral.

In the lead-up to The Derby, Black Bear Island raced in the Prix La Force at Longchamp and finished 3rd, followed by a win in the Dante Stakes. He finished tenth in the Derby.  After being sold to American connections, Black Bear Island was shipped to Arlington Park and ran 2nd in the Grade One Secretariat Stakes.  He subsequently raced unplaced in 3 further starts.

Sold to a partnership led by former Hollywood Park chairman RD Hubbard, Black Bear Island was narrowly defeated in the Grade 1 Secretariat Stakes on the Arlington Million card before joining Los Angeles-based trainer Julio Canani, for whom he was eighth in the Hollywood Derby in November.

According to the Daily Racing Form, Black Bear Island was being prepared for a US turf campaign in 2010 when he suffered a fatal injury.

Pedigree

References

2006 racehorse births
2010 racehorse deaths
Thoroughbred family 1-n
Racehorses bred in Ireland
Racehorses trained in Ireland